Sylvirana cubitalis is a species of frog in the family Ranidae. It is found in Myanmar, Thailand, Laos, China, and possibly Vietnam.

Its natural habitats are monsoon evergreen forest and rainforest, usually near fast-flowing streams, creeks and rivers. It is not considered threatened by the IUCN.

References

cubitalis
Amphibians of Myanmar
Amphibians of China
Amphibians of Laos
Amphibians of Thailand
Amphibians described in 1917
Taxonomy articles created by Polbot